Eugenie A. Blair (1864 – May 13, 1922) was an American stage actress best remembered for originating the role of Marthy Owen in the premiere 1921 Broadway presentation of Eugene O'Neill's play Anna Christie. Blair died moments after walking offstage at the Cort Theatre in Chicago during her performance as Anna Christie, which she chose to carry out in spite of not feeling well that evening.  She was survived by a daughter, the actress Eleanor Montell.  Blair had been married to Shakespearean actor Robert L. Downing, her second husband. Blair's Broadway appearances were sporadic until towards the end of her life. She toured extensively in her youth.

She collapsed and died after playing Marthy in Anna Christie in Chicago.

References

External links

Eugenie Blair portrait gallery (NY Public Library, Billy Rose collection)
portraits of her daughter, Eleanor Montell (Univ. of Washington, Sayre collection)
Eugenie Blair: North American Theatre Online

1864 births
1922 deaths
American stage actresses